White Dominican may refer to:
 White Dominicans (Dominican Republic)
 White Dominican (Dominica)